The acronym EUROP may refer to:

 European Robotics Platform, an initiative to improve the competitive situation of the European Union in the field of robotics.
 EUROP grid, a beef grading system